Indosphere is a term coined by the linguist James Matisoff for areas of Indian linguistic and cultural influence in South Asia and Southeast Asia. It is commonly used in areal linguistics in contrast with Sinosphere.

Influence

The Tibeto-Burman family of languages, which extends over a huge geographic range, is characterized by great typological diversity, comprising languages that range from the highly tonal, monosyllabic, analytic type with practically no affixational morphology, like the Loloish languages, to marginally tonal or atonal languages with complex systems of verbal agreement morphology, like the Kiranti group of Nepal. This diversity is partly to be explained in terms of areal influences from Chinese on the one hand and Indo-Aryan languages on the other. Matisoff proposed two large and overlapping areas combining cultural and linguistic features – the "Sinosphere" and the "Indosphere", influenced by China and India respectively. A buffer zone between them as a third group was proposed by Kristine A. Hildebrandt, followed by B. Bickel and J. Nichols. The Indosphere is dominated by Indic languages.

Some languages and cultures firmly belong to one or the other. For example, the Munda and Khasi branches of Austroasiatic languages, the Tibeto-Burman languages of Eastern Nepal, and much of the "Kamarupan" group of Tibeto-Burman, which most notably includes the Meitei (Manipuri), are Indospheric; while the Hmong–Mien family, the Kam–Sui branch of Kadai, the Loloish branch of Tibeto-Burman, and Vietnamese (Viet–Muong) are Sinospheric. Some other languages, like Thai and Tibetan, have been influenced by both Chinese and Indian culture at different historical periods. Still other linguistic communities are so remote geographically that they have escaped significant influence from either. For example, the Aslian branch of Mon–Khmer in Malaya, or the Nicobarese branch of Mon–Khmer in the Nicobar Islands of the Indian Ocean show little influence by Sinosphere or Indosphere. The Bodish languages and Kham languages are characterized by hybrid prosodic properties akin to related Indospheric languages towards the west and also Sinospheric languages towards the east. Some languages of the Kiranti group in the Indosphere rank among the morphologically most complex languages of Asia.

Indian cultural, intellectual, and political influence – especially that of Pallava writing system – began to penetrate both insular and peninsular Southeast Asia about 2000 years ago. Indic writing systems were adopted first by Austronesians, like Javanese and Cham, and Austroasiatics, like Khmer and Mon, then by Tai (Siamese and Lao) and Tibeto-Burmans (Pyu, Burmese, and Karen). Indospheric languages are also found in Mainland Southeast Asia (MSEA), defined as the region encompassing Laos, Cambodia, and Thailand, as well as parts of Burma, Peninsular Malaysia and Vietnam. Related scripts are also found in South East Asian islands ranging from Sumatra, Java, Bali, south Sulawesi and most of the Philippines. The learned components of the vocabularies of Khmer, Mon, Burmese and Thai/Lao consist of words of Pali or Sanskrit origin. Indian influence also spread north to the Himalayan region. Tibetan has used Ranjana writing since 600 AD, but has preferred to calque new religious and technical vocabulary from native morphemes rather than borrowing Indian ones. The Cham empires, known collectively as Champa, which were founded around the end of 2nd century AD, belonged directly to Indosphere of influence, rather than to the Sinosphere which shaped so much of Vietnamese culture and by which Chams were influenced later and indirectly.

Structure

Languages in the "Sinosphere" (East Asia and Viet Nam) tend to be analytic, with little morphology, monosyllabic or sesquisyllabic lexical structures, extensive compounding, complex tonal systems, and serial verb constructions. Languages in the "Indosphere" (South Asia and Southeast Asia) tend to be more agglutinative, with polysyllabic structures, extensive case and verb morphology, and detailed markings of interpropositional relationships. Manange (like other Tamangic languages) is an interesting case to examine in this regard, as geographically it fits squarely in the "Indospheric" Himalayas, but typologically it shares more features with the "Sinospheric" languages. Tibeto-Burman languages spoken in the Sinosphere tend to be more isolating, while those spoken in the Indosphere tend to be more morphologically complex.

Many languages in the western side of the Sino-Tibetan family, which includes the Tibeto-Burman languages, show significant typological resemblances with other languages of South Asia, which puts them in the group of Indosphere. They often have heavier syllables than found in the east, while tone systems, though attested, are not as frequent. Indospheric languages are often toneless and/or highly suffixal. Often there is considerable inflectional morphology, from fully developed case marking systems to extensive pronominal morphology found on the verb. These languages generally mark a number of types of inter-casual relationships and have distinct construction involving verbal auxiliaries. Languages of the Indosphere typically display retroflex stop consonants, postsentential relative clauses and the extended grammaticalization of the verb say. In Indospheric languages, such as the Tibeto-Burman languages of Northeast India and Nepal, for example, the development of relative pronouns and correlative structures as well as of retroflex initial consonants is often found.

See also
 Sanskritisation's key drivers
 Greater India, Indian sphere of cultural influence
 History of Indian influence on Southeast Asia
 Indianisation, in wider global historic and contemporary context
 Mandala, a political model which was key driver of Indosphere
 Other related 
 Indian honorifics, influenced the Malaysian, Thai, Filipino and Indonesian honorifics
 Indian Diaspora, ancient (PIO) and current (NRI)
 Siam Devadhiraj
 East Asian cultural sphere

References

Further reading
 Bradley, David; LaPolla, Randy; Michailovsky, Boyd; and Thurgood, Graham (editors). Language variation: Papers on variation and change in the Sinosphere and in the Indosphere in honour of James A. Matisoff, pp. 113–144. Canberra: Pacific Linguistics.

External links
 Papers on variation and change in the Sinosphere and in the Indosphere in honour of James A. Matisoff
 Language diversity: Sinosphere vs. Indosphere
 Himalayan Languages Project
 Rethinking Tibeto-Burman -- Lessons from Indosphere
 Areal linguistics and Mainland Southeast Asia

 
Tibeto-Burman languages
Languages of India
Sprachbund
Terms coined by James Matisoff